PSPaudioware.com s.c. (Professional Sound Projects) is a software company that develops digital signal processors and audio effects for use in composing, recording, mixing, mastering, post-production, and broadcasting. It was co-founded by lifelong friends Antoni Ozynski and lead developer Mateusz Wozniak, after finishing university, in Warsaw, Poland in 2000. PSPaudioware was one of the first developers of audio plug-ins for digital audio workstations. Its motto is "It's the sound that counts!"

Beginnings and PSP VintageWarmer

In 2000, PSPaudioware released the PSP StereoPack and PSP MixPack to underwhelming response. In 2002 it released PSP VintageWarmer, a unique audio processor which was awarded Computer Music's "Ultimate Buy" award, has received great reviews and endorsements from professionals worldwide, and remains PSPaudioware's best selling plug-in. PSPaudioware continues to release well-regarded software audio processors, creative effects, and digital simulations of hardware audio effects and devices.

Lexicon PCM42 and PSP 84

In 2002, PSPaudioware unveiled a software emulation of the Lexicon PCM42. Lexicon themselves approved the plug-in and gave them the rights to use the name. PSPaudioware later released their own variation on the PCM42, dubbed the PCM 84. In 2010, the PSP 84 was updated to the PSP 85.

Products
 PSP StereoPack
 PSP MixBass
 PSP MixSaturator
 PSP MixPressor
 PSP MixTreble
 PSP VintageWarmer
 Lexicon PSP 42
 PSP 84
 PSP EasyVerb
 PSP MasterQ
 PSP Nitro
 PSP MasterComp
 PSP 608MD
 PSP Neon HR
 PSP VintageWarmer2
 PSP Xenon
 PSP MixPack2 (with PSP MixGate)
 PSP  (PSP ClassicQ, PSP ConsoleQ, PSP RetroQ, PSP )
 PSP oldTimer
 PSP McQ
 PSP 85
 PSP N2O
 PSP MixPack2
 PSP 
 PSP NeonHR2
 PSP NobleQ
 PSP BussPressor
 Auria (includes PSP MasterStrip, PSP ChannelStrip) 
 PSP Echo
 PSP PianoVerb2
 PSP SpringBox
 PSP 2Meters
 PSP X-Dither
 PSP L'otary
 PSP TripleMeter
 PSP MasterQ2
 PSP L'otary2
 PSP 2445
 PSP E27 (officially endorsed by Avedis audio)
 PSP 
 PSP B-Scanner
 PSP 2445 EMT (officially endorsed by EMT)
 PSP 
 PSP FETpressor
 PSP 
 PSP Nexcellence

References

External links
 TapeOp interview of Mateusz Wozniak
 TapeOp interview of Mateusz Wozniak (cont.)
 Speakhertz Talk Audio, "Interview: PSP Audioware Founders – Mateusz Wozniak And Antoni Ozynski"

Companies based in Warsaw
Software companies of Poland
Polish brands